Yomra Arena is an indoor multi-purpose sports venue located in Yomra town of Trabzon Province, Turkey. The arena has a seating capacity of 500 spectators.

The arena hosted the wrestling events at the 2007 Black Sea Games and gymnastics event for girls during the 2011 European Youth Summer Olympic Festival.

References

Sports venues in Trabzon
Gymnastics venues
Wrestling venues